Sainte-Florence is a Canadian forestry village in the province of Quebec, located in the Matapédia Valley in the Gaspé Peninsula.

The municipality had a population of 367 as of the Canada 2021 Census.

Municipal council
 Mayor: Réjeanne Doiron
 Councillors: Pierrette Bérubé, Lauraine Gendron, Nelson Barrest, Henri Lafrance, Carol Poitras, France Lepage

Demographics

Population

See also
 List of municipalities in Quebec

References

Municipalities in Quebec
Incorporated places in Bas-Saint-Laurent
La Matapédia Regional County Municipality